Lalanne may refer to:

French communes
 Lalanne, Gers, in the Gers department
 Lalanne, Hautes-Pyrénées, in the Hautes-Pyrénées department
 Lalanne-Arqué, in the Gers department
 Lalanne-Trie, in the Hautes-Pyrénées department

Other uses
 Lalanne (surname)
 Les Lalanne, French artist duo